Basketball is a part of the South Asian Games since the 1987 edition.

Results

Men's tournament

Women's tournament

Championships per nation (Incomplete)

Participation Details

References

External links
 Pakistan basketball team named for 11th South Asian Games, gz2010.cn, accessed 25 March 2012.
 South Asian Games: Shooters, swimmers shine as India consolidate dominance, TimesOfIndia.com, accessed 16 May 2012.

Basketball at the South Asian Games
Sports at the South Asian Games
South Asian Games
South Asian Games